Mette Gregaard (8 June 1908 – 19 January 1978) was a Danish diver. She competed in the women's 10 metre platform event at the 1936 Summer Olympics.

References

1908 births
1978 deaths
Danish female divers
Olympic divers of Denmark
Divers at the 1936 Summer Olympics
Divers from Copenhagen